oz. is a common abbreviation for ounce, referring to several units of measure.

Oz or OZ may also refer to:

Arts and entertainment
 Land of Oz, the setting for many of L. Frank Baum's novels

Fictional characters and entities
 Oz (Buffy the Vampire Slayer), a character from the TV series
 Oz (One Piece), a manga character
 OZ (Ultimate Marvel), a mutagen
 OZ, a virtual world, virtual reality in the movie Summer Wars
 Leonard "Oz" Osbourne, a Geordie bricklayer in British TV series Auf Wiedersehen, Pet, played by Jimmy Nail
 Chris Ostreicher, a character in the American Pie film series
 Nicholas "Oz" Oseransky, a character in the comedy film, The Whole Nine Yards and its sequel, The Whole Ten Yards.
 Organization of the Zodiac, or Oz, an organization in the anime series Mobile Suit Gundam Wing
 Oz Vessalius, a protagonist in the manga Pandora Hearts
 Oz, a playable character in Call of Duty: Advanced Warfare'''s Exo Zombies mode
 Wizard of Oz (character), often known simply as "Oz"

 Comics 
 Oz (comics), a comic book series based on The Wizard of Oz Oz (Judge Dredd story), a mini-series
 Oz (Buffy comic)
 Oz (2000 AD), a future city in Australia
 Oz, a manga by Natsumi Itsuki

 Music 
 Oz (Finnish band), a heavy metal band
 Oz (Missy Higgins album), a 2014 album
 FZ:OZ, an album by Frank Zappa
 Oz (soundtrack), the soundtrack for the HBO television series
 OZ (record producer), a record producer from Switzerland
 "Oz", a song by Two Hours Traffic from their self-titled debut album

Publications
 Oz (magazine), an Australia/UK underground satire magazine published from 1963 to 1973
 The Oz, a nickname for the newspaper The Australian OZ (radio amateur magazine), a Danish radio amateur magazine published by Experimenterende Danske Radioamatører
 Liber OZ, a text by Aleister Crowley.

Other arts and entertainment
 The Dr. Oz Show, a syndicated daytime television show
 Oz (TV series), an HBO-produced prison drama
 Oz (1976 film), an Australian update of The Wizard of Oz OZ - Over Zenith, a game for the PlayStation 2Oz: Into the Wild, a novel featuring the Buffy the Vampire Slayer character Oz

Businesses and organizations
 OZ Group, an Italian wheel manufacturer
 OZ Minerals, an Australian mining company
 Circus Oz, an Australian circus group
 The Oz Film Manufacturing Company, an independent film studio from 1914 to 1915, co-founded by L. Frank Baum
 CHOZ-FM, a Canadian radio station based in St. John's, Newfoundland and Labrador, known as OZ FM
 Asiana Airlines (IATA code OZ since 1988)
 Ozark Air Lines (IATA code OZ until 1986)

People
 Oz (surname), a list of people
 Oz (given name), a list of people with either the given name or nickname
 Oz Fox (born 1961), stage name of Richard Alfonso Martinez, lead guitarist of the Christian glam metal band Stryper
 OZ (record producer), Swiss record producer and songwriter Ozan Yıldırım (born 1992)
 Oz, ring name of Kevin Nash (born 1959), American semi-retired professional wrestler

Places
 A nickname for Australia; see Name of Australia
 Oz, Isère, a town and commune'' in France
 Oz, Kentucky, an unincorporated community
 Oz Park, a public park in Chicago
 A nickname for Oswego, New York

Science and technology
 Oz (programming language)
 .oz, a former MHSnet domain
 .oz, an OpenNIC hosted Top-level domain
 OZ Virtual, a 3D world viewer
 Oz: an EEG electrode site according to the 10-20 system

Other uses 
 Oz Brigade, an Israel Defense Forces commando brigade
 Congregation Ohab Zedek, a Manhattan synagogue sometimes abbreviated OZ
 The Opel symbol.

See also
 Ornstein–Zernike equation, in statistical mechanics
 O2 (disambiguation)
 OS (disambiguation)